The Michel Governments were various Belgian federal governments led by Prime Minister Charles Michel:
 Michel I Government (2014–2018)
 Michel II Government (2018–2019)